The festival ran June 13–15, and 80,000 attended. In 2003, The Bonnaroo organizers planned a festival called Bonnaroo Northeast to take place in Riverhead, Long Island, New York. This festival, as well as the Field Day Festival, another festival to take place at the same site, were cancelled, however, in the weeks leading up to the event due to concern about securing permits in time.

Lineup

Friday, June 13
(artists listed from earliest to latest set times)

What Stage:
RJD2
Jack Johnson
DJ Spooky
Ben Harper & the Innocent Criminals
Kid Koala
Neil Young & Crazy Horse
Which Stage:
Antibalas Afrobeat Orchestra
Yonder Mountain String Band
Lucinda Williams
Béla Fleck and the Flecktones
This Tent:
Rebirth Brass Band
Jason Mraz
Joshua Redman
Keller Williams
The Funky Meters
That Tent:
My Morning Jacket
Ben Kweller
Tortoise
Sonic Youth
Sound Tribe Sector 9
The Other Tent:
Gavin Degraw
Ekoostik Hookah
Sticky Fingers
Soft Parade
Cinema Tent:
Kids in the Hall: Brain Candy
Chris Rock: Bring the Pain
Robin Williams on Broadway
Jackass: The Movie
Car Wash
2003 NBA Finals Game 5
Caddyshack
Amandla!: A Revolution in Four-Part Harmony
Austin City Limits - Beck with The Flaming Lips

Saturday, June 14
(artists listed from earliest to latest set times)

What Stage:
Wailers Band
Emmylou Harris
Phonosycograph DJ Disk
The Allman Brothers Band
DJ Z-Trip
Widespread Panic
Mark Farina
Which Stage:
Robinella and the CCstringband
Nickel Creek
The Roots
Robert Randolph and the family
This Tent:
Liz Phair
Jon Cleary & the Absolute Monster Gentlemen
Cyro Baptista's Beat the Donkey
Leo Kottke & Mike Gordon
Medeski Martin & Wood
That Tent:
Kaki King
Trachtenburg Family Slideshow Players
The Polyphonic Spree
Garage A Trois
The Flaming Lips
Particle
The Other Tent:
Jerry Joseph & The Jackmormons
Josh Kelley
Mr. Brownstone
The Machine
Cinema Tent:
Dogtown and Z-Boys
Pee Wee's Big Adventure
Time Bandits
Scratch
Eddie Murphy Raw
The Nightmare Before Christmas
The Rocky Horror Picture Show
Pootie Tang
Star Wars
The Empire Strikes Back

Sunday, June 15
(artists listed from earliest to latest set times)

What Stage:
Warren Haynes
Josh Wink
Galactic
DJ Z-Trip
James Brown
Mixmaster Mike
The Dead
Which Stage:
The New Deal
North Mississippi Allstars
G. Love & Special Sauce
moe.
This Tent:
The Slip
Drive-By Truckers
Spearhead
SuperJam
That Tent:
Topaz
O.A.R.
Vusi Mahlasela of Amandla!
Toots and the Maytals
The Other Tent:
Buddahead
RAQ
Zoso
Cinema Tent:
Jerry Seinfeld: I'm Telling You for the Last Time
Enter the Dragon
The Warriors
Standing in the Shadows of Motown
2003 NBA Finals Game 6
Spaceballs

Superjam
(Core band members only, guests not included)

Dr. John (grand Piano/hammond b-3 and vocals), Mike Gordon (bass) Luther Dickinson (guitar and vocals), Stanton Moore (drums)

References

Bonnaroo Music Festival by year
2003 in American music
Bonnaroo
2003 music festivals
Bonnaroo